Re Daniel Dawal Migel is a 1998 Sri Lankan Sinhala comedy, action film directed by Roy de Silva and produced by Soma Edirisinghe for E.A.P Films. It is the first film of Re Daniel Dawal Migel film franchise. It stars comic duo Bandu Samarasinghe, and Tennyson Cooray in lead roles along with Ranjan Ramanayake, Sangeetha Weeraratne and Maduranga Chandimal. Music for the film is done by Somapala Rathnayake. The film became one of Sri Lanka's blockbuster movies with reaching more than 150 days in cinema theatres. It is the 894th Sri Lankan film in the Sinhala cinema.

Plot
Daniyel (Bandu) and Migel (Tennyson) are two kind-hearted, but thieves in the village. They were known to steal chickens, goats, cattle and also do canny things and they are caught by the village head master. With these incidents, they started to leave the village and move to town. After moving to town, two detectives cobra and his allie (Roy and Lietch) looking for Daniyel and Migel to arrest them. Meanwhile, Daniyel and migel were caught by gangs through a woman Madhuri (Sangeetha). After a fight, and Daniyel and Migel become friends with Madhuri. The gang is led by Chandi ayya (Ranjan) and they came to seek Madhuri. Daniyel and Migel rescues Madhuri and Chandi Ayya also left the gang and become friends. After many incidents, the four of them escape from two detectives several times and fall in love with higher noble families, indicating that the four are also very rich. Soon the lovers realized the fake and refused them. The final battle with Chandi ayya's former group is taken place and the four realized their lies. Daniyel and Migel are arrested at the end credits.

Cast
 Bandu Samarasinghe as Ra Daniyel 
 Tennyson Cooray as Dawal Migel
 Ranjan Ramanayake as Chandi Ayya
 Sangeetha Weeraratne as Madhuri
 Maduranga Chandimal as Sanjaya
 Roy de Silva as C.I.D Cobra
 Sumana Amarasinghe as Sanjaya's mother
 Ronnie Leitch as Cobra helper 
 Ruwanthi Mangala as Nirosha
 Feliz Premawardena

Soundtrack

Sequel
Two more films of the franchise have been released. The second installment Re Daniel Dawal Migel 2 was released on 2000 and third and final installment Re Daniel Dawal Migel 3 was released on 2004.

References

1998 films
1990s Sinhala-language films